The Shire of Brookton is a local government area in the Wheatbelt region of Western Australia, about  southeast of Perth, the state capital.

The local economy, worth approximately $25 million per year to the state economy, is based on agriculture - predominantly cereal grains and sheep.

History

The Brookton Road District was established on 27 April 1906 after Mr Samuel Williams led a move by local landowners to break away from the Beverley Road District, and met for the first time on 10 September that year. On 1 July 1961, it became the Shire of Brookton under the Local Government Act 1960, which reformed all remaining road districts into shires.

Wards
The shire presently is undivided and has 7 councillors. Prior to the 2009 local government election, it was divided into three wards as follows:

 Central Ward (5 councillors)
 West Ward (2 councillors)
 East Ward (2 councillors)

Towns and localities
The towns and localities of the Shire of Brookton with population and size figures based on the most recent Australian census:

Population

Heritage-listed places
As of 2023, 89 places are heritage-listed in the Shire of Brookton, of which none are on the State Register of Heritage Places.

References

External links

 

Brookton